Sacha Delaye (born 23 April 2002) is a French professional footballer who plays as a midfielder for  club Le Puy, on loan from  club Montpellier.

Career 
Delaye is a youth product of Montpellier. He made his professional debut with the club in a 2–1 Ligue 1 win over Nantes on 23 May 2021. On 10 January 2023, Delaye joined Championnat National club Le Puy on loan for the rest of the season.

Personal life
Delaye is the son of Philippe Delaye, who was also a professional footballer and played for Montpellier.

References

External links
 
 MHS Foot Profile

2002 births
Living people
Footballers from Rennes
French footballers
Footballers from Montpellier
Association football midfielders
Ligue 1 players

Championnat National 2 players
Championnat National 3 players
Montpellier HSC players
Le Puy Foot 43 Auvergne players